There are two  electric multiple unit (EMU) train types operated by the Tokyo subway operator Tokyo Metropolitan Bureau of Transportation (Toei) on the Toei Oedo Line in Tokyo, Japan:
Toei 12-000 series
Toei 12-600 series